Nelson Park may refer to:

Nelson Park, Kent, United Kingdom
Nelson Park, Napier, a cricket ground in Napier
Nelson Park Township, Marshall County, Minnesota, United States
Nelson Park, Vancouver, Canada